Americans in Ireland comprise Irish citizens and residents who have full or partial American descent or ancestral background. These individuals often use the term 'American-Irish', in order to differentiate from the Irish-American cultural group.

History

Celtic Tiger and present

Demographics
Those with American-Irish dual citizenship represent 16.8% of all Irish people with dual nationality. As of 2016, there are 10,519 Americans in Ireland without any Irish citizenship.

Culture and integration
There is little noted strife surrounding integration, owing to the fact that Ireland is one of the most Americanized countries in Europe.
Voter registration drives occurred in the run-up to the 2020 American Presidential Election. Democrats Abroad maintains a notable political base in the country.
Cultural events, such as the Fourth of July and Thanksgiving are celebrated by the resident American population, as well as other affiliated groups. Several towns with large American populations host fireworks displays, while the American Chamber of Commerce hosts an annual Thanksgiving dinner, which is attended by the Taoiseach. Black Friday (Aoine Mhór na Siopadóireachta - literally Big Friday of Shopping) has become widely observed in Ireland, however, largely facilitated by physical retailers competing with internet sale promotions, though remains largely detached from its Thanksgiving roots.

Notable people
 Erskine Hamilton Childers – 4th President of Ireland
 Éamon de Valera – 3rd President of Ireland
 Frank McCourt – Irish-American writer
 Marsha Hunt – African American singer and novelist
 Matt Doyle – Irish professional tour tennis player
 Constantine Fitzgibbon – Historian and novelist
 Chryss Goulandris – American businesswoman
 Lennie McMillian – Irish professional basketball player
 Tom Molineaux – Bare-knuckle boxer
 Charles Stewart Parnell – Founder and leader of the Irish Parliamentary Party
 Darren Randolph – Irish football goalkeeper
 Saoirse Ronan – American-born Irish actress
 Kevin Shields – American-born Irish musician
 Des Bishop – American-raised Irish comedian
 Ronan O'Gara – American born rugby player
 Dana Rosemary Scallon – singer and politician
 Katherine Zappone – American-born Irish Senator and academic

See also 
 Irish American

References

Ethnic groups in Ireland
Ireland